is a railway station operated by Central Japan Railway Company (JR Central) and is located in the western part of the city of  Gifu, Gifu Prefecture, Japan.

Lines
Along with Gifu Station and Nagamori Station, it is one of the three JR Central stations in the city of Gifu.

Layout
There is one elevated island platform with the station building located underneath. The station has a Midori no Madoguchi staffed ticket office.

Platforms

Adjacent stations

|-
!colspan=5|Central Japan Railway Company

History
Nishi-Gifu Station was first opened on 1 November 1986 as part of Japan National Railways. On 1 April 1987, it became part of JR Central. In the latter half of 2006, the station underwent remodeling, which added elevators for public use, as well as TOICA-supported ticket machines.

Station numbering was introduced to the section of the Tōkaidō Line operated JR Central in March 2018; Nishi-Gifu Station was assigned station number CA75.

Passenger statistics
In fiscal 2016, the station was used by an average of 6011 passengers daily (boarding passengers only).

Surrounding area
Museum of Fine Arts, Gifu

Bus services
On the south side of Nishi-Gifu Station is a stop for the free Fureai Bus, which connects passengers with the Gifu Prefectural Office and other stops in between. They can also board the Nishi-Gifu Kurukuru Bus, which runs through the local community. Gifu Bus Co., Ltd. has a bus stop near the main entrance, connecting the station with many areas throughout the city.

See also
 List of Railway Stations in Japan

References

External links

  

Railway stations in Japan opened in 1986
Buildings and structures in Gifu
Railway stations in Gifu Prefecture
Stations of Central Japan Railway Company
Tōkaidō Main Line